Amadeo is a Spanish and Portuguese name derived from the Latin name Amadeus. It may refer to:

People
  for people with the first name Amadeo
 Amadeo I of Spain (1845–1890)
 Amadeo Bordiga (1889–1970), founder of the Communist Party of Italy
 Amadeo Giannini, co-founder of the Bank of America
 Amadeo Labarta (1905–1989), Spanish footballer
 Giovanni Antonio Amadeo, Italian sculptor
 Mario Amadeo (1911–1983), Argentine politician, diplomat and writer 
 Mike Amadeo, American musician and composer

Fictional
 Armand (vampire), from Anne Rice's The Vampire Chronicles

Other
 Amadeo (Austrian record label)
 Amadeo, Cavite, a municipality in Cavite, Philippines
 Casa Amadeo, antigua Casa Hernandez, an historic Latin music store in New York City

See also

Amadea (disambiguation)
Amadee (disambiguation)
Amédée (disambiguation)
Amedeo (disambiguation)
Amadeus (disambiguation)

Italian masculine given names